Statue of Francisco Franco may refer to:

 Equestrian statue of Francisco Franco, formerly in Madrid – by José Capuz, 1956
 Statue of Francisco Franco, Melilla – by Enrique Novo Álvarez, 1978